Heidi Østlid Bagstevold (born 10 July 1987) is a Norwegian orienteering competitor.

Orienteering career
Bagstevold competed at the 2013 World Orienteering Championships, and won a gold medal in the relay with the Norwegian team, together with Mari Fasting and Anne Margrethe Hausken Nordberg. She became national champion in the long distance in 2010, and in sprint in 2013.

She was born in Kongsberg, but lives in Fredrikstad and represents Fredrikstad SK.

References

External links
 
 

1987 births
Living people
Norwegian orienteers
Female orienteers
Foot orienteers
World Orienteering Championships medalists
People from Kongsberg
Sportspeople from Viken (county)
21st-century Norwegian women